Władysław Młynek (6 June 1930 in Gródek – 1 December 1997 in Nawsie) was a Polish teacher, writer and poet from Zaolzie region of Cieszyn Silesia.

He was the son of Jan Młynek, a social activist. He attended Polish elementary school in Gródek and later a Polish Gymnasium in Český Těšín where he expressed his interest about the poetry of Adam Mickiewicz. Młynek then worked as a teacher in Polish schools in Zaolzie - in Třinec, Hnojník, Milíkov, Bukovec and at Kamienity hill in the Beskids mountain range.

He set up and conducted many choirs in schools where he worked and was an art director of Gorol men's choir in Jablunkov from 1978 and art director of Gorolski Święto festival from 1983.

Młynek was an active member of several Polish organizations including the Stowarzyszenie Młodzieży Polskiej (Association of Polish Youth) and the PZKO (Polish Cultural and Educational Union) and was a chairman of the General Committee (ZG) of the PZKO from 1990 to 1993. He was also a member of many literary organizations and the editor-in-chief on Zwrot magazine from 1992 to 1993.

He wrote his poetry in literary Polish and also in Cieszyn Silesian dialect. His poetry often focuses on the life of the common people, mostly Gorols. Prose collection Śpiewające zbocza (Singing Slopes) is inspired by his teaching experience in a small mountain school at the Kamienity hill in the Beskids mountain range. Młynek maintained close relations with other Polish writers of Zaolzie of that time, mostly Paweł Kubisz and Adam Wawrosz.

Władysław Młynek died suddenly on 1 December 1997 in Nawsie, where he lived for most of his life. He is buried at local Protestant cemetery.

His daughter Halina is a singer.

Works 
His works were part of following anthologies:
 Mrowisko (1964)
 Zaprosiny do stołu (1978)
 Słowa i krajobrazy (1980)
 Suita zaolziańska (1985)
 Na cieszyńskiej ziemi (1985)
 Zaproszenie do źródła (1987)
 Samosiewy (1988)
 Z biegiem Olzy (1990)

He published the following works:
 Śpiywy zza Olzy (1983) (poetry)
 Śpiewające zbocza (1989) (prose)
 Droga przez siebie (1992) (poetry)

Footnotes

References 
 
 
 
 Profile of Władysław Młynek in Zwrot 8/2007: 40.
 

1930 births
1997 deaths
People from Frýdek-Místek District
Polish male poets
Polish educators
Polish Lutherans
Polish people from Zaolzie
20th-century Polish poets
20th-century Polish male writers
20th-century Lutherans